Self defined ethnicity (SDE) codes are a set of codes used by the Home Office in the United Kingdom to classify an individual's ethnicity according to that person's self-definition.

The codes are also called "18 + 1" codes, as there are 18 of them, plus one code (NS) for "not stated". In addition to the previously used 16+1 codes, they contain the categories W3 and O2, while A4 is now replacing O1 (Chinese).

The code system originated in the United Kingdom Census 2001 based on Recommendation 61 of the Stephen Lawrence Inquiry Report (SLIR).

British police forces are required to use the SDE 18+1 codes (as opposed to the commonly used radio shorthand IC codes) when spoken contact has taken place and an individual has been given an opportunity to state their self-perceived ethnicity.

List of SDE codes

White
 W1 – British
 W2 – Irish
 W3 – Gypsy or Irish Traveller
 W9 – Any other White background

Mixed or Multiple ethnic groups
 M1 – White and Black Caribbean
 M2 – White and Black African
 M3 – White and Asian
 M9 – Any other Mixed or Multiple background

Asian or Asian British
 A1 – Indian
 A2 – Pakistani
 A3 – Bangladeshi
 A4 – Chinese
 A9 – Any other Asian background

Black, Black British, Caribbean or African
 B1 – Caribbean
 B2 – African
 B9 – Any other Black, Black British or Caribbean background

Other ethnic groups
 O2 – Arab
 O9 – Any other ethnic group

Not stated
 NS – Not Stated.

See also
Classification of ethnicity in the United Kingdom
IC codes

External links 
 Ethnicity facts and figures. Government data about the UK's different ethnic groups.

References

Demographics of the United Kingdom
Encodings
Law enforcement in the United Kingdom